Mick Gannon (born 2 February 1943) is an English former professional footballer who played as a defender for Everton, Scunthorpe United, Crewe Alexandra, and Altrincham.

References

1943 births
Living people
Footballers from Liverpool
English footballers
Association football defenders
Everton F.C. players
Scunthorpe United F.C. players
Crewe Alexandra F.C. players
Altrincham F.C. players
English Football League players